Lanyon Peak is a sharp rock peak  east of Victoria Upper Glacier in the Saint Johns Range of Victoria Land, Antarctica. It was named by the Advisory Committee on Antarctic Names for Margaret C. Lanyon, a New Zealand national who for many years in the 1960s and 1970s served in a secretarial and administrative capacity with the U.S. Antarctic Research Program, in Christchurch.

References

Mountains of Victoria Land
McMurdo Dry Valleys